Košarkaški klub Železničar, commonly referred to as KK Železničar Inđija, is a men's professional basketball club based in Inđija, Serbia. They are currently competing in the 3rd-tier First Regional League - North.

The club competed in the Basketball League of Serbia during the 2011–12 season.

Players

Current roster

Coaches 

  Dobrivoje Ćorović (1990–1991)
  Dragan Marinković 
  Zoran Sretenović (2006–2007)
  Zoran Sretenović (2009–2010)
  Aleksandar Bućan (2010–2011)
  Ivan Smiljanić (2011)
  Ivica Mavrenski (2011–2012)
  Vinko Bakić (2012)
  Vladimir Jojić (2019–present)

References

External links
 Official website
 KK Železničar at srbijasport.net

Zeleznicar Indjija
Basketball teams in Yugoslavia
Basketball teams established in 1970